The women's marathon event at the 2015 Military World Games was held on 11 October at the KAFAC Sports Complex.

Records
Prior to this competition, the existing world and CISM record were as follows:

Schedule

Medalists

Individual

Team

Results

Individual

Team

References

marathon
2015 in women's athletics
Mil
2015 Military World Games